The 2010 Kerala Sahitya Akademi Award was announced on 6 January 2011.

Winners

Endowments
I. C. Chacko Award: P. Sreekumar (Adhvanam, Bhasha, Vimochanam)
C. B. Kumar Award: Hameed Chennamangaloor (Oru Mathanirapekshavadiyude Swathanthra Chinthakal)
K.R. Namboodiri Award: Dr. P. V. Ramankutty (Yajurveda Sameeksha)
Kanakasree Award: Soorya Binoy (Nizhalppura)
Geetha Hiranyan Award: Susmesh Chandroth (Swarna Mahal)
G. N. Pillai Award: K. Babu Joseph (Apekshikathayude 100 Varsham)
Kuttipuzha Award: Dr. N. M. Namboothiri (Kakkad: Kaviyum Kavithayum)

References

Kerala Sahitya Akademi Awards
Kerala Sahitya Akademi Awards